The Extraordinary and Plenipotentiary Ambassador of Peru to the Argentine Republic is the official representative of the Republic of Peru to the Argentine Republic.

Both countries established relations in 1822, with both countries having come into existence as a result of Argentine-born José de San Martín's campaigns in the River Plate and Lower Peru during the Spanish American wars of independence. The first Peruvian representative to Argentina was Manuel Blanco Encalada. Relations have continued since, having been warm for the most part, with the exception of a scandal during the Cenepa War in 1995.

List of representatives

References

Argentina
Peru